William Henry Witte (October 4, 1817 – November 24, 1876) was a Democratic member of the U.S. House of Representatives from Pennsylvania.

William H. Witte was born in the Columbia section of Knowlton Township, New Jersey.  He moved to Springtown, Bucks County, Pennsylvania.  He moved to Philadelphia in 1840, and engaged in mercantile pursuits and the real estate business.

Witte was elected as a Democrat to the Thirty-third Congress.  He was engaged in newspaper work and resumed real estate interests.  He died in Philadelphia in 1876.  Interment in Durham Cemetery in Durham Township, Pennsylvania.

Sources

The Political Graveyard

1817 births
1876 deaths
American newspaper people
Politicians from Philadelphia
Democratic Party members of the United States House of Representatives from Pennsylvania
19th-century American journalists
American male journalists
19th-century American male writers
19th-century American politicians
Journalists from Pennsylvania
People from Knowlton Township, New Jersey